La Tour d'Auvergne was a noble French dynasty. Its senior branch, extinct in 1501, held two of the last large fiefs acquired by the French crown, the counties of Auvergne and Boulogne, for about half a century. Its cadet branch, extinct in 1802, ruled the duchy of Bouillon in the Southern Netherlands from 1594, and held the dukedoms of Albret and Château-Thierry in the peerage of France since 1660. The name was also borne by Philippe d'Auvergne, an alleged collateral of the original Counts of Auvergne, and was adopted by the famous soldier Théophile Corret de la Tour d'Auvergne, who descended from an illegitimate line of the family.

Senior line: counts of Auvergne and Boulogne 

Although various La Tours are mentioned in the documents from the 11th and 12th century, the family history remains unclear until the 13th century, when they owned the lordship of la Tour in the county of  Auvergne, hence the name.

The medieval family was related through marriages to other notable families of the French south, including Ventadour, La Rochefoucauld, and Levis-Mirepoix.

The la Tours d'Auvergne maintained close ties with the Avignon popes, and many of them became bishops and cardinals, particularly after 1352, when Guy de la Tour married Marthe Rogier of Beaufort, Popes Gregory XI's niece and Clement VI's grand niece. Their son  (1375–1423) married a rich heiress, Marie I, Countess of Auvergne, in 1389, with their son  succeeding as Count of Auvergne and Boulogne in 1437.

Bertrand V's grandson Jean III de la Tour d'Auvergne (1467–1501) was the last medieval Count of Auvergne, Boulogne, and Lauraguais. By his marriage to Jeanne of Bourbon-Vendôme, he had two daughters:

 The elder daughter, Anne de la Tour d'Auvergne, married John Stewart, 2nd Duke of Albany, but died childless.
 The younger, Madeleine de la Tour d'Auvergne, married Lorenzino de Medici and gave birth to Catherine de' Medici, who inherited both Auvergne and Boulogne, when Anne died childless. Catherine also became Queen of France.

John's elder sister, Jeanne de la Tour d'Auvergne, married Aymar de Poitiers.  They were the grandparents of Diane de Poitiers, mistress of King Henry II of France.

The cadet line of this family, extinct in 1497, also owned the lordship of Montgascon. Anne de la Tour d'Auvergne, the last of this line and heiress to this lordship, married three times:

 firstly, in 1506, to Charles of Bourbon, Count of Roussillon.
 secondly, in 1510, to John of Montmorency, lord of Chantilly.
 thirdly, in 1518, to her distant cousin, Francis II de la Tour, Viscount of Turenne. For her issue by the last marriage, see below.

Junior line: viscounts of Turenne and princes of Sedan 

Bertrand de La Tour d'Auvergne, owner of Olliergues and several other seigneuries, was the author of the junior line of the family.

He died in 1329 and was buried in Clermont-Ferrand. His great grandson William de la Tour became bishop of Rodez and Catholic Patriarch of Antioch. The latter's nephew, Agne IV of Oliergues, married in 1444 his cousin, viscountess Anne of Beaufort, succeeding to the viscounty of Turenne upon her death.

Among his children, the younger, Antony Raymond, lord of Murat, became the ancestor of the obscure line of la Tour-Apchier, which rose to prominence shortly before its extinction in the 19th century.

Agne IV's fifth and eldest surviving son, Anthony de la Tour, succeeded him as viscount of Turenne and had two children. The youngest, Gilles de la Tour, lord of Limeuil, had issue, including Isabeau of Limeuil, known as the mistress of Louis I de Bourbon, Prince de Condé and mother of his natural children.

Francis II de la Tour d'Auvergne, viscount of Turenne (1497–1532) was the eldest son of Anthony de la Tour and husband of Anne de la Tour de Montgascon (see above). Their grandson, Henry de la Tour d'Auvergne (1555–1623), is remembered as a faithful adherent of Henri IV's Huguenot cause and Marshal of France. His first wife was Charlotte de la Marck, heiress to the principality of Sedan and to the duchy of Bouillon. Upon her death, Henry inherited her titles and dominions and remarried Elisabeth of Orange-Nassau, William the Silent's daughter.

Hoping to succeed the Orange rulers of the Netherlands, their son and heir Frederic Maurice of the Tour d'Auvergne (1605–1652) remained in the Dutch service until his marriage to Eléonore-Catherine-Fébronie de Wassenaar de Berg, which was effected against his family's wishes in 1634 and led to his conversion to Catholicism.

Compromised in the Cinq-Mars conspiracy, he was pardoned on condition that he would exchange his principalities of Sedan, Jametz, and Raucourt - highly important strategically - for the titles of duke of Albret and duke of Château-Thierry in the French peerage. This exchange was formalized in 1651. Although Frederic Maurice was promised to take rank from the original creation of the duchy of Château-Thierry for Robert III of the Marck in 1527, this could never be effected due to vocal opposition of other dukes-peers.

The younger brother of Frédéric Maurice de La Tour d'Auvergne, Henri de La Tour d'Auvergne, vicomte de Turenne, (1611–1675), is undoubtedly the most illustrious member of the family. Among the most successful generals in French military history. A grateful Louis XIV honored Turenne with burial at the royal necropolis at Saint-Denis and Napoléon considered him to be the greatest military commander of all times.

Later history: Dukes of Bouillon and Albret 
Frederic-Maurice's son, Godefroy Maurice de La Tour d'Auvergne (1641–1721), was the first member of his family to become a truly sovereign duke of Bouillon. This happened in 1678 when the Duchy of Bouillon was finally reconquered from the Spaniards by the Marshal de Créquy. Apart from his ducal titles, Godefroy-Maurice also held the title of Count of Évreux. He became the Grand Chamberlain of France in 1658 and governor of Auvergne in 1662. All these titles would remain in the La Tour d'Auvergne family for more than a century.

The family were created Foreign Princes in France in 1651, this entitled them to the style of [Most Serene] Highness at the French court in which they lived.

Godefroy-Maurice's younger brother, Count Frederic Maurice de La Tour d'Auvergne (1642–1707), was a prominent general in the service of the Dutch. He married Henrietta von Hohenzollern (1648–1698), heiress to the marquessate of Bergen-op-Zoom, a title which passed to their children. After their line became extinct in 1732, Bergen devolved upon Count Palatine Johann Christian von Sulzbach (1700–1733), who had married an heiress, Marie Henriette Leopoldine de La Tour d'Auvergne, in 1722.

Godefroy-Maurice's wife, Marie Anne Mancini (1649–1714), best remembered for her literary pursuits and for her patronage of La Fontaine, was a niece of Cardinal Mazarin. Their eldest son Louis married the heiress to the dukedom of Ventadour but predeceased his parents. The Duchy of Bouillon and other titles passed to their second son, Emmanuel Théodose (1668–1730), whose fourth wife was Louise Henriette Françoise de Lorraine. Another son, Frédéric-Jules, Prince d'Auvergne (1672–1733), married an Irish adventuress.

Charles Godefroy de La Tour d'Auvergne (1706–1771) was Emmanuel-Théodose's son and the 5th Duke of Bouillon. His wife was his brother's widow, Maria Karolina Sobieska, the granddaughter of King John Sobieski of Poland. Their only daughter, Marie Louise Henriette Jeanne de La Tour, was a famous adventuress and was guillotined in 1793. Although officially married to Jules de Rohan, Duke of Montbazon, she had an illegitimate son who died in infancy by her cousin, Charles Edward Stuart, Jacobite claimant to the thrones of England and Scotland.

Her brother, Godefroy Charles Henri de La Tour d'Auvergne (1728–1792), was the 6th Duke of Bouillon. He married Louise de Lorraine, known prior to marriage as Mademoiselle de Marsan. He served with distinction in the Seven Years' War and was elected to the Royal Academy of Sculpture and Painting in 1777. In just three months, he squandered almost a million livres on his mistress, an opera singer, thus bringing his family to the verge of ruin. Although the 6th duke embraced the French Revolution enthusiastically, the Duchy of Bouillon was annexed by the Republic within three years after his death. His only son, Jacques Léopold Charles Godefroy, incapacitated by a road accident, died in 1802, leaving no issue of his marriage to a Princess of Hesse-Rheinfels. As a consequence, the main line of the La Tour d'Auvergne family became extinct.

Bouillon Succession 
In 1780, the 6th Duke of Bouillon developed a friendship with Philippe d'Auvergne, a British naval officer imprisoned in France. As a family legend had it, the Dauvergne family represented a collateral branch of the ancient Counts of Auvergne, which had moved to the island of Jersey sometime in the 13th century. In 1787, the 6th Duke recognized this legendary connection and adopted Philippe d'Auvergne, calling on him to succeed his own son in the case the latter were to die without male issue.

In 1809 Napoleon endorsed an arrangement, whereby the La Tour estates and liabilities pertaining to the 1651 exchange devolved upon the French state. The 6th Duke's Château de Navarre and the Hôtel d'Évreux in Paris were bequeathed to the Empress Josephine and her relatives. The Hôtel d'Évreux was subsequently renamed the Élysée Palace and currently serves as the official residence of the President of France. As for the Duchy of Bouillon, its citizens recognized Philippe d'Auvergne as their legitimate ruler and duke.

The Congress of Vienna, however, awarded the sovereignty of the duchy to the King of the Netherlands, whereas the private property holdings of the former dukes were to be redistributed by special arbitration either to Philippe d'Auvergne or to an Austrian claimant, Charles-Alain-Gabriel de Rohan-Guéméné, who was the last duke's closest relative in the female line. The issue was eventually settled in Rohan's favor. Philippe d'Auvergne committed suicide September 16 or 18, 1816, in the Holmes Hotel, a small hotel located at Great Smith Street in Westminster.

In 1817, Rohan was sued by other claimants to the La Tour d'Auvergne estate, including the duc de Bourbon, the duc de La Tremoille, the princesse de Bourbon-Condé and the princesse de Poix. All were related to the 7th duke of Bouillon on his maternal side. Seven years later, their claims were upheld by a court in Liège, and Rohan had to step down as duke.

In the 1820s, the La Tour name and inheritance were disputed between the families of La Tour d'Auvergne d'Apchier, which represented the last known surviving line of the La Tour d'Auvergne before its eventual extinction in 1896, and "La Tour d'Auvergne-Lauraguais", a family whose kinship to the Dukes of Bouillon is unestablished. From the latter family, Prince Henri de La Tour d'Auvergne-Lauraguais (1876–1914) married in 1904 Elisabeth Berthier de Wagram (1885–1960), daughter of the third Prince de Wagram and a descendant, in female line, of the Rothschild dynasty.

Partial family tree

See also
Duchess of Bouillon
Duke of Bouillon

References

Account of the Duchy of Bouillon, by François Velde

 
History of Auvergne
Dukes of Bouillon
Duchesses of Bouillon